Timothy John Burke (born February 3, 1982 in Paul Smiths, New York) is a retired U.S. biathlete and coach. On December 20, 2009, he became the first ever US biathlete to lead the overall Biathlon World Cup. During his career he competed in 11 Biathlon World Championships and four Winter Olympic Games, won a World Championship silver and took six podiums in World Cup races.

Career

Early career

Burke first took up biathlon in 1997 and soon became a promising prospect on the national level, first competing for the United States in the Biathlon Junior World Championships in 2000. Burke competed in the World Junior Championships another three times, but without ever finishing in the top 10.

Burke's formative years were plagued by ill health. Most critically, he had career-threatening hip problems in 2002, eventually managing a full recovery after surgery. He also suffered from mononucleosis.

First World Cup seasons

Burke debuted in the Biathlon World Cup in the latter half of the 2003–04 season at Ruhpolding, Germany. This season also marked Burke's first World Championships; however, he failed to make an international impact, not achieving any World Cup points.

Burke made his first US Olympic team in 2006, and came quite close to achieving his first World Cup points (the Olympics being part of the Biathlon World Cup), placing 35th in the sprint and 36th in the following pursuit. However, his moment of international attention came as Jay Hakkinen surprisingly brought the US team to the first exchange in first place. Burke, on the second leg, thus had the honour of leading the Olympic relay. However, this did not last long, as US dropped to 8th place on Burke's leg with him needing all three spare rounds in both shootings; they eventually finished 9th.

Per Nilsson of Sweden became the head coach of team US in 2006. Burke, whose results soon improved markedly under Nilsson's guidance, credits the Swede with "teaching me what hard training really looks like." The 2006–07 season was a great success for Burke, who got the first World Cup point of his career already in the season-opening 20 km individual at Östersund, Sweden with a 30th place and followed up with another five points finishes, including the first top 10 finish of his World Cup career in a sprint at Hochfilzen, Austria. Burke got his season-best 6th-place finish in a mass start at Pokljuka, Slovenia on January 21, 2007. At the World Championships in Antholz, Italy, Burke placed 7th in the individual competition. He eventually finished a very respectable 25th in the overall World Cup standings.

The 2007–08 season was a disappointment as Burke suffered from health problems again and failed to improve on the previous year, finishing 29th in the overall World Cup. However, Burke finished that year on a high note as in the second-last race of the season, a pursuit at Holmenkollen, Oslo, Norway he became the first ever US biathlete to have the best scratch time in a World Cup competition; though as he entered the pursuit from a meager 45th place, he still only finished 7th. In the last race, a mass start, he placed 8th despite four penalty loops. These were his best finishes that year.

2009–10 World Cup season

The first half of the 2009–10 Biathlon World Cup season marked Burke's breakthrough to the absolute elite of biathlon. In an individual 20 km competition at Östersund, Sweden, the opener of the 2009–10 World Cup season, Burke became the second ever US biathlete to finish 2nd in a Biathlon World Cup competition. (Josh Thompson had been the first.) Burke continued to produce solid results in the following competitions, consistently finishing in the top 20. This solidity – combined with the absence of Norwegian World Cup leader Emil Hegle Svendsen from the third competition weekend at Pokljuka, Slovenia and the disastrous 103rd place of Austria's Christoph Sumann in the Pokljuka sprint – meant that on December 20, 2009 Burke, despite never winning a World Cup race, became the first ever US biathlete to capture the overall World Cup lead.

Burke initially held that position for just one competition, as he only finished 19th in a 10 km sprint at Oberhof, Germany in adverse weather conditions. The winner, Evgeny Ustyugov of Russia, in turn captured the World Cup leader's yellow bib for the first time in his career. However, Burke recaptured the lead in the very next race (the first mass start of the season) by matching his career-best 2nd-place finish.

Burke then entered a slump with a season-worst 31st place the next weekend in a sprint at Ruhpolding. His bad form continued at Antholz, Italy, as he finished 29th in the 20 km individual competition and 21st in the sprint.

2010 Winter Olympics
At the 2010 Vancouver Winter Games, Burke had big expectations and aimed to win a medal but instead left at one of the lowest in his 14 years as a USA national team member. This came as a disappointment to him as prior to the competition, he had medalled on the World Cup Tour. In addition, there was media hype around his participation as he was the first American to lead the Biathlon World Cup standings and was a strong medal contender. The increased media attention may have impacted his possible success, as he felt he did "a bad job dealing with that". There was also poor snow conditions which can lead to more friction for the athletes, resulting in slower speeds.
Burke placed 18th in mass start, 45th in individual, 46th in pursuit, 47th in sprint and 13th in relay. His first race was the individual, where landing him at 45th place came as a shock to him as it was his lowest finish that season.

After his 15k mass start race, his coach, Nilsson, believed that Burke did not find the balance "between calm and aggressiveness". Burke reflected on his own race, suggesting it may have been the pressure that ultimately got to him and caused him to make the three misses that ended his chances in medalling. Evgeny Ustyugov from Russia, Martin Fourcade from France and Pavol Hurajt from Slovakia placed first, second and third, respectively.

After the Olympics

Burke's problems continued in the last races of the season. He fell ill after the Olympics and failed to score another top 20 finish until the second-last individual race of the season, a 10 km sprint at Khanty-Mansiysk, Russia, where he finished 11th despite one miss at both shooting stages. Thanks to his strong early season, he still finished a career-best 14th in the overall World Cup.

Post-competition career
After Burke retired from competition at the end of the 2017-18 season, in May 2018 he was announced as athlete development manager with U.S. Biathlon Association. The following year he was appointed to the newly created post of Director of Athlete Development with the USBA, working alongside his former team-mate Lowell Bailey, who had been appointed as the Association's High Performance Director.

Personal life
Since October 25, 2014, Burke has been married to former German biathlete Andrea Henkel. He has expressed support for stricter gun control in the United States, stating during the 2018 Winter Olympics that although he was a keen hunter, "if locking up all my sport rifles and hunting rifles meant saving one life, I would do it".

Biathlon results
All results are sourced from the International Biathlon Union.

Olympic Games
0 medals

*The mixed relay was added as an event in 2014.

World Championships
1 medal (1 silver)

*During Olympic seasons competitions are only held for those events not included in the Olympic program.
**The mixed relay was added as an event in 2005.

Notes

References

External links
Statistics

1982 births
American male biathletes
Biathletes at the 2006 Winter Olympics
Biathletes at the 2010 Winter Olympics
Biathletes at the 2014 Winter Olympics
Biathletes at the 2018 Winter Olympics
Living people
Olympic biathletes of the United States
People from Franklin County, New York
Biathlon World Championships medalists
Sportspeople from New York (state)
American sports coaches
Cross-country skiing coaches